This page discusses the rivers and hydrography of the state of New South Wales, Australia.

The principal topographic feature of New South Wales is the series of low highlands and plateaus called the Great Dividing Range, which extend from north to south roughly parallel to the coast of the Coral and Tasman seas of the South Pacific Ocean.

The two main categories of rivers in New South Wales, are those that rise in the Great Dividing Range and flow eastwards to the sea, the Coastal NSW Rivers; and those that rise on the other side of the crest of the range and flow westward, the Inland NSW Rivers. Most of the inland rivers eventually combine into the Murray-Darling network of rivers, which drains to the sea in South Australia.

Major rivers
The following rivers are the longest river systems, by length.

Coastal rivers 
Due to the relatively close proximity of the Great Dividing Range to the eastern coast of New South Wales, in general, the coastal rivers are short, navigable only in their lowest reaches, if at all, and subject to flooding in periods of high rainfall. The inland rivers have little water, are also subject to flooding,  and their limited resources are extensively used for irrigation in the more arid inland agricultural districts of the State. On all of the significant inland rivers, large dams have been constructed to regulate the water flow, to facilitate irrigation, and in some cases, to generate hydro-power.

For administrative purposes, the rivers are generally grouped into four major catchments defined by their drainage basin, and then a series of sub-catchments. The following is a list of the coastal rivers in New South Wales, in order from north to south, grouped according to catchment and sub-catchments, from mouth to upper reaches, organised by tributary:

Northern Rivers catchment

Tweed River sub-catchment
 Coral Sea
 Tweed River
 Oxley River
 Rous River

Brunswick River sub-catchment
 Coral Sea
 Brunswick River

Richmond River sub-catchment
 Coral Sea
 Evans River
 Richmond River
 Bungawalbin Creek 
 Wilsons River
 Coopers Creek (designated as a river)
 Leycester Creek (designated as a river)
 Back Creek (designated as a river)
 Eden Creek (designated as a river)
 Sandy Creek (designated as a river)
 Shannon Brook (designated as a river)

Clarence River sub-catchment
 Coral Sea
 Clarence River
 Mann River
 Nymboida River
 Boundary Creek (Nymboida) (designated as a river)
 Blicks River
 Glen Fernaigh River
 Boundary Creek (Glen Fernaigh) (designated as a river)
 Clouds Creek (designated as a river)
 Boyd River
 Sara River
 Oban River
 Nowlands Creek (designated as a river)
 Guy Fawkes River
 Aberfoyle River
 Chandlers Creek (designated as a river)
 Little Murray River
 Bielsdown River
 Little Nymboida River
 Bobo River
 Henry River
 Yarrow River
 Tooloom Creek (designated as a river)
 Beaury Creek (designated as a river)
 Cataract River
 Coldstream River
 Timbarra River
 Orara River
 Urumbilum River
 Kangaroo River
 Towallum River
 Esk River
 Corindi River
 Maryland River
 Boonoo Boonoo River
 Sandon River
 Wooli Wooli River
 Barcoongere River

Bellinger River sub-catchment
 Tasman Sea
 Bellinger River
 Never Never River
 Rosewood River
 Kalang River

Nambucca-Macleay River sub-catchment
 Tasman Sea
 Nambucca River
 Taylors Arm (designated as a river)
 Macleay River
 Apsley River
 Tia River
 Yarrowitch River
 Warnes River
 Chandler River
 Oaky River
 Styx River
 Wollomombi River
 Dyke River
 Gara River
 Commissioners Waters (designated as a river)
 Georges Creek (designated as a river)
 Blue Mountain Creek (designated as a river)
 Christmas Creek (designated as a river)
 Kunderang Brook (designated as a river)

Hastings River sub-catchment
 Tasman Sea
 Hastings River
 Forbes River
 Pappinbarra River
 Tobins River
 Thone River
 Ellenborough River
 Doyles River
 Maria River
 Wilson River
 Camden Haven River

Hunter and Central Rivers catchment

Manning River sub-catchment
 Tasman Sea
 Manning River
 Pigna Barney River
 Barnard River
 Back River
 Myall River
 Curricabark River
 Nowendoc River
 Cooplacurripa River
 Mummel River
 Walcrow River
 Rowleys River
 Burns Creek (designated as a river)
 Cells River
 Connollys Creek (designated as a river)
 Dingo Creek (designated as a river)
 Bobin Creek (designated as a river)
 Caparra Creek (designated as a river)
 Cedar Party Creek (designated as a river)
 Dawson River
 Lansdowne River
 Gloucester River
 Barrington River
 Cobark River
 Dilgry River
 Moppy River
 Kerripit River
 Bowman River
 Avon River

Great Lakes sub-catchment
 Tasman Sea
 Coolongolook River
 Wallamba River
 Wallingat River
 Wang Wauk River
 Karuah River
 Mammy Johnsons River
 Wards River
 The Branch River
 Telegherry River
 Myall River
 Crawford River

Hunter River sub-catchment
 Tasman Sea
 Hunter River
 Pages Creek (designated as a river)
 Moonan Brook (designated as a river)
 Stewarts Brook (designated as a river)
 Paterson River
 Allyn River
 Williams River
 Chichester River
 Wangat River
 Rouchel Brook (designated as a river)
 Pages River
 Isis River
 Goulburn River
 Munmurra River
 Cooba Bulga Stream (designated as a river)
 Cattle Creek (designated as a river)
 Krui River
 Bow River
 Merriwa River
 Worondi Rivulet
 Bylong River
 Growee River
 Lee Creek (designated as a river)
 Baerami Creek (designated as a river)
 Widden Brook (designated as a river)
 Blackwater Creek (designated as a river)
 Wollombi Brook
 Congewai Creek (designated as a river)
 Cedar Creek (designated as a river)

Sydney basin catchment

Central Coast sub-catchment
 Tasman Sea
 Lake Macquarie
 Dora Creek (designated as a river)
 Tuggerah Lake
 Budgewoi Lake
 Lake Munmorah
 Wyong River
 Cedar Brush Creek
 Wamberal Lagoon
 Terrigal Lagoon
 Avoca Lake

Hawkesbury-Nepean sub-catchment
 Tasman Sea
 Hawkesbury River
 Grose River
 Nepean River
 Glenbrook Creek
 Erskine Creek
 Bedford Creek
 Glen Erskine Creek
 Warragamba River
 Coxs River
 Kedumba River
 Little River (Oberon)
 Jenolan River
 Kowmung River
 Hollanders River
 Tuglow River
 Wollondilly River
 Paddys River
 Tonalli River
 Nattai River
 Little River (Wollondilly)
 Tarlo River
 Jooriland River
 Mulwaree River
 Wingecarribee River
 Joadja Creek
 Little River (Wingecarribee)
 Burke River
 Little Burke River
 Cordeaux River
 Avon River
 Cataract River
 Bargo River
 Colo River
 Wollemi Creek
 Wollangambe River
 Wolgan River
 Capertee River
 South Creek 
 Eastern Creek 
 Breakfast Creek
 Bells Creek
 Reedy Creek
 Kemps Creek
 Bonds Creek
 Blaxland Creek
 Ropes Creek
 Badgerys Creek
 Macdonald River
 Mangrove Creek (designated as a river) 
 Mooney Mooney Creek (designated as a river)
 Berowra Creek
 Cowan Creek
 Coal and Candle Creek
 Smiths Creek
 Pittwater

Sydney Metropolitan sub-catchment
 Tasman Sea
 Bilgola Creek
 Port Jackson
 Middle Harbour
 Middle Harbour Creek
 Parramatta River
 Iron Cove Creek
 Hawthorne Canal
 Lane Cove River
 Gore Creek
 Scout Creek
 Devlins Creek
 Terrys Creek
 Tarban Creek
 Powells Creek
 Saleyards Creek
 Haslams Creek
 Duck River
 A'Becketts Creek
 Duck Creek
 Little Duck Creek
 Charity Creek
 Smalls Creek 
 Archer Creek
 Subiaco Creek
 The Ponds Creek
 Vineyard Creek
 Darling Mills Creek
 Toongabbie Creek
 Blacktown Creek
 Whites Creek
 Johnstons Creek
 Orphan School Creek
 Botany Bay
 Cooks River
 Coxs Creek
 Wolli Creek
 Bardwell Creek
 Cup and Saucer Creek
 Alexandra Canal
 Georges River
 Cabramatta Creek
 Prospect Creek 
 Orphan School Creek (Fairfield)
 Clear Paddock Creek
 Salt Pan Creek
 Woronora River
 Boggywell Creek
 Port Hacking
 Hacking River

Southern Rivers catchment

Illawarra sub-catchment
 Tasman Sea
 Lake Illawarra
 Minnamurra River
 Port Kembla

Shoalhaven River sub-catchment
 Tasman Sea
 Shoalhaven River
 Kangaroo River
 Mongarlowe River
 Corang River
 Endrick River
 St Georges Basin

Eurobodalla catchment
 Tasman Sea
 Clyde River
 Yadboro River
 Bimberamala River
 Buckenbowra River
 Moruya River
 Deua River
 Araluen Creek (designated as a river)
 Majors Creek (designated as a river)
 Bettowynd Creek (designated as a river)
 Tomaga River
 Tuross River
 Back River
 Wadbilliga River
 Queens Pound River
 Yowrie River
 Pambula River
 Yowaka River

Far South Coast sub-catchment
 Tasman Sea
 Bega River
 Brogo River
 Bemboka River
 Nunnock River
 Bermagui River
 Genoa River
 White Rock River
 Wallagaraugh River
 Imlay Creek (designated as a river)
 Merimbula Lake
 Merrica River
 Murrah River
 Dry River
 Nadgee River
 Twofold Bay
 Nullica River
 Towamba River
 Wog Wog River
 Pambula River
 Wonboyn River

Snowy River sub-catchment
 Bass Strait 
 Snowy River (mouth located in Victoria) 
 Mowamba River
 Maclaughlin River
 Jacobs River
 Delegate River
 Bombala River
 Undowah River
 Coolumbooka River
 Little Plains River
 Bendoc River
 Queensborough River
 Pinch River
 Eucumbene River
 Gungarlin River
 Burrungubugge River
 Thredbo River
 Little Thredbo River
 Suggan Buggan River (river and mouth located in Victoria)
 Ingeegoodbee River (mouth located in Victoria)

Inland-flowing rivers 
The inland-flowing rivers in New South Wales can be considered in two groups. In the northern half of the state, a series of rivers rise on the western side of the Great Dividing Range. These rivers flow west and northwest and eventually combine into the Barwon, which becomes the Darling River further west near Bourke. The waters of the Darling River then flow south through the arid far west of NSW.

The second group of inland-flowing rivers in NSW rise in the southern part of the state, sourced predominantly from the western and southern slopes of the Snowy Mountains and the western slopes of the Great Dividing Range, and combine directly with the Murray River, which forms the southern border of NSW with Victoria.

The two groups converge at Wentworth in the far south-west corner of the state, where the Murray River crosses the New South Wales/Victorian/South Australia border, east of Paringa in South Australia.

North-western New South Wales 
 Darling River  in the northwestern sector of the state.
 Barwon River
 Bokhara River
 Moonie River
 MacIntyre River
 Boomi River
 Dumaresq River
 Bluff River
 Severn River (Queensland)
 Mole River
 Severn River, New South Wales
 Beardy Waters
 Gwydir River also Copeton Dam
 Horton River
 Moredun Creek
 Rocky River
 Mehi River
 Namoi River  also Keepit Dam
 Peel River
 Cockburn River
 Manilla River
 Mooki River
 Macdonald River
 Castlereagh River
 Macquarie River  also Burrendong Dam
 Talbragar River
 Coolaburragundy River
 Cudgegong River
 Little River
 Bell River
 Turon River
 Crudine River
 Fish River
 Duckmaloi River
 Campbells River
 Bogan River

South-western New South Wales 
In the southwestern sector of the state:
 Murray River  also Lake Hume
 Murrumbidgee River  also Burrinjuck Dam
 Lachlan River  also Wyangala Dam
 Abercrombie River
 Bolong River
 Isabella River
 Boorowa River
 Belubula River
 Crookwell River
 Tumut River   also Blowering Dam
 Goobarragandra River
 Doubtful Creek (designated as a river)
 Goodradigbee River
 Yass River
 Molonglo River also Cotter River and other rivers of the ACT
 Queanbeyan River
 Jerrabomberra Creek (designated as a river)
 Bredbo River
 Strike-a-Light River
 Edward River
 Wakool River
 Swampy Plain River
 Geehi River  see Snowy Mountains Scheme
 Tooma River
 Tumbarumba Creek (designated as a river)

See also

 List of rivers of New South Wales (A-K) - Detailed listing of New South Wales rivers showing previous names and source locations for each river.
 List of rivers of New South Wales (L-Z) - Detailed listing of New South Wales rivers showing previous names and source locations for each river.
 List of rivers of Australia for an alphabetical listing including rivers in other Australian states

References

External links
 Guide to Sydney Rivers site

 
Floods in New South Wales